Christine Terraillon (born 16 September 1943) is a French alpine skier. She competed in the women's downhill at the 1964 Winter Olympics.

References

1943 births
Living people
French female alpine skiers
Olympic alpine skiers of France
Alpine skiers at the 1964 Winter Olympics